"More Bounce to the Ounce" is the debut single by American funk band Zapp. It is the opening track on their eponymous debut album and serves as the album's first single. The song was written, arranged, composed and produced by Roger Troutman; and it peaked at No. 86 on the Billboard Hot 100 in 1980.

The song title was taken from a 1950s Pepsi ad campaign of the same name.

Chart positions

Legacy
The song was the inspiration behind  the Tom Tom Club's 1981 hit "Genius of Love," itself one of the most sampled tracks of the New Wave era. "We loved [‘More Bounce’] in part because it was played at a slower, funkier tempo by far than so many other dance tracks of the period," said Tom Tom Club’s Chris Frantz. "It was very relaxed and sexy while still maintaining a raw, hard edge."

The song is featured in the 1999 film Any Given Sunday, the 2002 Rockstar video game Grand Theft Auto: Vice City and the 2018 South Park episode "A Boy and a Priest". It was also in an episode of "New Girl" (Season 4, episode 20). A short clip of the song was also played at the Dr. Dre and Snoop Dogg concert tour Up in Smoke Tour in 2000, which can be found in the DVD release.  The song also featured in the 1995 crime/drama film La Haine.

See also
Atomic Dog

References

External links
 
 

1980 debut singles
Funk songs
Song recordings produced by Bootsy Collins
Song recordings produced by Roger Troutman
Songs written by Roger Troutman
Zapp (band) songs
Warner Records singles
1980 songs